Fish Lake National Forest was established as the Fish Lake Forest Reserve by the General Land Office in Utah on February 10, 1899 with .  After the transfer of federal forests to the U.S. Forest Service in 1905, it became a National Forest on March 4, 1907. On July 1, 1908 Glenwood National Forest was added and the name was changed to Fishlake National Forest.

References

External links
Forest History Society
Forest History Society:Listing of the National Forests of the United States Text from Davis, Richard C., ed. Encyclopedia of American Forest and Conservation History. New York: Macmillan Publishing Company for the Forest History Society, 1983. Vol. II, pp. 743-788.

Former National Forests of Utah
1899 establishments in Utah
1908 disestablishments in Utah